Troy Anthony Auzenne (born June 26, 1969) is a former professional American football offensive tackle in the National Football League. He played five seasons for the Chicago Bears (1992–1995) and the Indianapolis Colts (1996). He played college football at California.

High school

Auzenne attended Bishop Amat High School in La Puente, California, and was a letterman in football and track. He was a first-team All League selection in 1986. He graduated in 1987.

College

After redshirting his first year at Cal, Auzenne became a starting left tackle as a freshman, and held that position for four years. By his senior year he became a consensus 1st team All-Pac-10 selection and a 1st team All American.  After retirement from the NFL, Auzenne was enshrined in the Cal Athletics Hall Of Fame in 2003.

NFL career

Auzenne was drafted in the 2nd round by the Chicago Bears. Because of his pass-protection ability, he was named the starter at Left Tackle three weeks into camp and became the Bears' first offensive rookie in 16 years to start every game. At the end of the 1992 season he was the runner up offensive rookie of the year to the Saints' Vaughn Dunbar. He also won the Brian Piccolo Award. The Bears' players vote amongst themselves for the player who best exemplifies the courage, loyalty, teamwork, dedication and sense of humor of the late Brian Piccolo. In 1996 Auzenne signed with the Indianapolis Colts as a free agent. After one season his career was cut short by a knee injury.

References

Players of American football from California
Sportspeople from Los Angeles County, California
American football offensive tackles
1969 births
Living people
California Golden Bears football players
Chicago Bears players
Indianapolis Colts players
People from El Monte, California
People from La Puente, California
Brian Piccolo Award winners